The women's 10,000 metres event at the 1994 Commonwealth Games was held in Victoria, British Columbia

Results

References

10000
1994
1994 in women's athletics